Frucourt is a commune in the Somme department in Hauts-de-France in northern France.

Geography

Population

Places of interest
 The windmill, built in brick in 1641. The walls are 6 ft (1,80m) thick at the base. It bears the (defaced) armorial of the seigneurs of the château of Frucourt, the Monthomer family. In June 2004, it was completely renovated and won a heritage prize " Les Rubans du Patrimoine".
 The château
 The church
 The war memorial

See also
Communes of the Somme department

References

Communes of Somme (department)